Not sold in stores or not available in stores, also known as "TV only", is a marketing strategy whereby goods are heavily advertised on television or online and purchased directly from the supplier or manufacturer. The order is usually placed through a 1-800 number call center and the payment by credit card (formerly C.O.D). The selling point of this approach is that the item is too "cutting edge" for a store. Conversely, the "not sold in stores" label can be interpreted to be a detriment, if one takes it to mean that no established retailers are willing to give their imprimatur to the merchandise.

In the last ten years, products "not sold in stores" have expanded from advertising on television almost exclusively to advertising on the Internet. Selling on the Internet also has reduced both the transaction costs of the selling through the automation of check-out and payment (no more paid phone operators) and the cost of the products themselves due to exemption from sales taxes. This trend of advertising on the Internet has further distinguished the not sold in stores genre from that of "As seen on TV!".

Despite the increased Internet activity, advertising on television remains the primary means that products marketed in this fashion reach the public eye. Since 1993, both the "not sold in stores" and the "as seen on TV" factions have moved from simple sixty-second commercials on late-night or cable television to one to three-hour long "infomercials".

"Not sold in stores" is beginning to be an advertising research tool. Items that do not actually exist are "sold" and the number of reactions determines whether the product might make a profit.

See also 
 As seen on TV
 Brand-new

Marketing techniques
English phrases